Sweetheart Video is a Canadian pornographic film studio based in Montreal, Quebec. The studio was founded by Jonathan Blitt and pornographic actress Nica Noelle in 2008, and it specializes in lesbian-themed films. Noelle initially wrote and directed all the films, but she left the studio in 2011. Subsequent films were initially written and directed by other people in the adult industry, including Melissa Monet, Dana Vespoli, and James Avalon; Vespoli now exclusively writes and directs all the films.

Main series
The studio has made many series of films, and this list includes the ones with the most sequels released:
 Lesbian Adventures
 Girls Kissing Girls
 Lesbian Babysitters
 Lesbian Beauties
 Mother Lovers Society
 Lesbian Office Seductions
 Lesbian Truth or Dare

Awards and nominations

Sweetheart Video's films have won and have been nominated for several awards, including AVN, XBIZ and XRCO Awards.

AVN Awards

Feminist Porn Awards

References

External links
 

 
2008 establishments in Quebec
Canadian pornographic film studios
Companies based in Montreal
Mass media companies established in 2008
Lesbian pornographic film studios
LGBT culture in Montreal